The Lost City Museum, formerly known as the Boulder Dam Park Museum, is located in Overton, Nevada and is one of seven managed by the Nevada Division of Museums and History, an agency of the Nevada Department of Tourism and Cultural Affairs.

History
The Lost City Museum shares its location with an actual prehistoric site of the Ancestral Puebloans. The museum  was built by the CCC conservation corps in 1935 and was operated by the National Park Service to exhibit artifacts from the Pueblo Grande de Nevada archaeological sites, which were going to be partially covered by the waters of Lake Mead as a result of building the Hoover Dam.

In 1981, an extension of the museum was built, incorporating some ruins in order to protect them and share them with the public.

Description
The museum offers a reconstructed Puebloan house-site that is open to visitors. The museum has displays depicting the excavations of the sites, artifacts unearthed during the project, pictures of the historical excavations, an excavated pithouse and reconstructions of the Puebloan houses. Pottery, shells, jewelry and many other examples that showcase the history of the early inhabitants are on display at the museum.

References

External links 

 Lost City Museum web site
 Information about the museum

Museums in Clark County, Nevada
Native American museums in Nevada
Archaeological museums in Nevada
Natural history museums in Nevada
Buildings and structures in Overton, Nevada
National Register of Historic Places in Clark County, Nevada
Native American history of Nevada
Pueblo Revival architecture
Museums established in 1935
1935 establishments in Nevada
Buildings and structures on the National Register of Historic Places in Nevada
Museums on the National Register of Historic Places